Noeleen Lambert is a camogie player, winner of All-Ireland Senior medals in All-Ireland Senior Camogie Championship of 2007, 2010 and 2011,

Other awards
National Camogie League medals in 2009, 2010 and 2011; Leinster Championship 2011 2010 2009; All-Star nominee in 2008 and 2010. 'The Star' player of the match in the 2009 League final; Leinster Under-14 1995, 1996; Leinster Under-18 1998; Leinster Junior 2003; Leinster Senior 2007; Junior Gael Linn Cup with Leinster 1999; Club Senior 'A' 2018; Club Senior 'B' 2003, 2007 (captain); Leinster Senior 'B' Colleges with Loreto (Wexford) 1996; Purple and Gold Star 2008. Sister of Wexford hurler Barry Lambert. Her father, Robert, also played hurling with Wexford in all grades, while her other brother, Robert, is a former county Minor.

References

External links
 Camogie.ie Official Camogie Association Website
 Wexford Wexford camogie site

1982 births
Living people
Wexford camogie players